Highway 202 is a highway in the Canadian province of Saskatchewan. It runs from Highway 2 near Tuxford to Highway 301 near the Buffalo Pound Provincial Park.

References

External links
Buffalo Pound Provincial Park

202